Piercey Dalton is a Canadian-American actress. She is most noted for her performance as Hannah Maynard in the 2021 film Be Still, for which she was a Vancouver Film Critics Circle nominee for Best Actress in a Canadian Film at the Vancouver Film Critics Circle Awards 2021.

Born in Tucson, Arizona and raised mainly in Fergus, Ontario, Dalton acted on stage in Vancouver before moving to Los Angeles to pursue film and television roles. Prior to Be Still, she was best known for her role as Naomi in the 2018 horror film The Open House.

Filmography

Film

Television

References

External links

21st-century American actresses
21st-century Canadian actresses
American film actresses
American stage actresses
American television actresses
Canadian film actresses
Canadian stage actresses
Canadian television actresses
Actresses from Tucson, Arizona
Actresses from Ontario
People from Centre Wellington
Living people

Year of birth missing (living people)